Callcott Reilly (28 October 1828 – 21 May 1900) was a British civil and construction engineer. He is noted for his work on uniform stress, as illustrated by reference to bridge building, for which the Institution of Civil Engineers awarded him the Telford Medal in 1865.  He played a prominent role in promoting the professional education of engineers and in 1871 became the first Professor of Engineering Construction at the newly formed Royal Indian Engineering College (RIEC) located at Coopers Hill near Englefield Green.

References 

1828 births
1900 deaths
People from Sheffield
People from Englefield Green
Engineers from Yorkshire